MeDirect Bank (Malta) plc (previously known as Mediterranean Bank) is a Maltese bank and financial services company with headquarters in Sliema. The Bank's main focus is on the savings, investments and wealth management sector - both for retail and corporate clients. MeDirect has branches across Malta and Gozo.

MeDirect Bank (Malta) plc has a subsidiary bank in Belgium where it is licensed and operates a direct bank known as MeDirect SA/NV that provides online investment opportunities and other saving products to retail investors.

History
MeDirect Bank (Malta) plc started off as Mediterranean Bank in June 2004, becoming a fully licensed Maltese credit institution a year later. Its headquarters and sole offices at that time were in Valletta. In July 2009, the bank was acquired and recapitalised by AnaCap Financial Partners LLP, a UK private equity firm. The bank was extended with new offices in central London, and grew both in Malta and abroad.

In 2010, Mediterranean Bank acquired a majority stake in Charts, a Maltese stockbroking, wealth management and corporate advisory firm, completing its takeover after five years, and then fully incorporating the Charts trading licence in 2018. This enabled MeDirect to offer investment advisory services, as well as corporate broking services to local and international companies.

The bank grew in Malta, creating branches in Sliema and Gozo, and acquiring Volksbank Malta Limited in 2014.

In 2013, MeDirect launched its Belgian business as an online bank offering savings, investments and wealth management services. MeDirect SA/NV became a fully licensed Belgian bank in 2015.

In 2014, MeDirect was Malta’s third largest bank. It is directly supervised by the European Central Bank and by the Malta Financial Services Authority. Its head office is located at The Centre – Tigne Point, Sliema.

In 2022, MeDirect revamped its brand with a promise of a better customer experience. As part of this new brand positioning, MeDirect aims to bridge the gaps between the old and new models of the banking sector. 

MeDirect has supported several Maltese community projects over the years, such as theatres, local sports clubs, cultural sites and charitable institutions.

External links
 Official Website

References

Banks of Malta
Banks established in 2004
European investment banks
Banks under direct supervision of the European Central Bank
2004 establishments in Malta